The River Clodiagh is a small river which rises in Lough Coumduala in the Comeragh Mountains in north County Waterford. (It should not be confused with the River Clodiagh in County Kilkenny.) It flows through the villages of Rathgormack, Clonea-Power and Portlaw before joining the River Suir just outside Portlaw. The river is fed by a number of smaller tributaries including Hunts stream and Aughtnawilliam stream.

Kayak tragedy
Two canoeists, one a sit-on kayak, drowned after being stuck in a weir at Portlaw, in April 2010.

References

External links

Clodiagh